Queensway may refer to:

Roads

Canada 
Queensway (Ottawa)
The Queensway, in Toronto and Mississauga, Ontario
York Regional Road 12 or Queensway, in Georgina Township, Ontario

Hong Kong 
Queensway (Hong Kong)

Singapore 
Queensway, a road in the Queenstown area

United Kingdom 
Queensway (Birmingham), West Midlands
Queensway, Gibraltar
Queensway, London
Queensway, Wellingborough, Northamptonshire
Queensway, Cheshire, a road in Widnes and part of the A557 road
Queensway Tunnel, in Merseyside
Queensway, part of the A726 road within East Kilbride, Scotland

Other uses 
 Queensway (horse), a racehorse
 Queensway (New York City), a planned park on the former Long Island Rail Road Rockaway Beach Branch
 Queensway (Stevenage), a shopping centre
 Queensway (retailer), a defunct furniture retailer
 Queensway Secondary School, Singapore
 Queensway tube station, in London
 Queensway, a proposed conversion of part of the Rockaway Beach Branch to a linear park

See also
Kingsway (disambiguation)
Queensway-Humber Bay, a neighbourhood in Toronto